Matias "Mati" Brain Peña (born January 15, 1974 in Santiago) is a Chilean triathlete. Nicknamed "Mati", Brain competed at the first Olympic triathlon at the 2000 Summer Olympics.  He took forty-first place with a total time of 1:53:44.90.

References
 Profile

1974 births
Living people
Chilean male triathletes
Pan American Games competitors for Chile
Olympic triathletes of Chile
Triathletes at the 1999 Pan American Games
Triathletes at the 2000 Summer Olympics
Sportspeople from Santiago
20th-century Chilean people
21st-century Chilean people